Denis Bellotti (born 7 May 1986) is a former Italian short track speed skater. He is bronze medallist of the 2007 European Championships. He represented Italy at the home 2007 Winter Universiade where he won a bronze medal in the relay competition. He briefly competed at the World Cup, achieving one personal podium and one relay victory during the 2006–07 season.

References

External links
 Profile in the ISU's database
 Profile at the shorttrackonline.info

1986 births
Living people
Italian male short track speed skaters
People from Sondalo
Universiade bronze medalists for Italy
Universiade medalists in short track speed skating
Competitors at the 2007 Winter Universiade